Alvito is a town and a municipality in Beja District in Portugal. The population in 2011 was 2,504, in an area of 264.85 km2.

The current president municipal chamber is António João Feio Valério.

History

The Alvito region has been inhabited since the Neolithic, and during the period of Roman domination several villae were established nearby, later occupied by Visigoths and Moors. During the Reconquista, Alvito was conquered by the Portuguese in 1234, being later (1251) donated by King Afonso III to Estêvão Anes, chancellor of the kingdom, who promoted the settlement of the area.

The village gained a foral (letter of feudal rights) in 1280, confirmed by King Dinis I in 1283. In 1296 an annual fair was established, attesting the rapid development of the region. In 1387, King John I donated Alvito to knight Diogo Lobo in exchange for his services in the decisive Battle of Aljubarrota (1385), and in 1475 the title of Baron was granted to the rulers of Alvito.

The 15th and 16th centuries were a time of strong economic and populational development of Alvito, which reached 1700 inhabitants in 1527. The Castle of Alvito was rebuilt between 1494 and 1504, and its architecture and decoration show an interesting mix of Manueline (Portuguese late Gothic) and Mudéjar (Arab-influenced) styles, typical of the Alentejo region. Also the main church (matriz) of Alvito, in a mix of Manueline and early Renaissance styles, dates from the early 16th century.

After the 18th century, Alvito faced an economic stagnation that continued until the 20th century, and it now bets on its touristic potential. In 1993, the Castle of Alvito was turned into a luxury hotel of the Pousadas de Portugal brand.

Parishes
 
Administratively, the municipality is divided into 2 civil parishes (freguesias):
 Alvito
 Vila Nova da Baronia

Cities and towns
The municipality includes one town:
 Alvito

Demographics

International relations

Alvito is twinned with:
 Alvito, Italy

References

External links

Official website
Photos from Alvito

Populated places in Beja District
Municipalities of Beja District